The European Network of Councils for the Judiciary (ENCJ) is the European organization that unites  the councils of the judiciary – national bodies in support of the Judiciary. From May 2018 the chairman is the Dutchman Kees Sterk. Presidents change every two years.

The ENCJ opts for cooptation of the judiciary and against the influence of parliamentary representatives in the composition of its ranks. It played an important role in the criticism from the European Union on developments in the control of the judiciary from parliament and executive power in countries such as Holland.

Presidents 
Judges who have served as president of the ENCJ.

Notes

External links 
 Website of the ENCJ

International organizations based in Europe
Political organizations based in Europe